Perc Horner (8 January 1913 – 29 January 2001) was an  Australian rules footballer who played with South Melbourne in the Victorian Football League (VFL).

Notes

External links 

1913 births
2001 deaths
Australian rules footballers from Victoria (Australia)
Sydney Swans players